Anzhenmen Station is a subway station on Line 10 of the Beijing Subway.

Station layout 
Anzhenmen station has an underground island and side platform. One of the tracks is unused.

Exits
The station has 4 exits, lettered A, B, C, and D. Exit C is accessible.

Gallery

References

External links

Beijing Subway stations in Chaoyang District
Railway stations in China opened in 2008